William Charles Gorman (13 July 1911 – December 1978) was an Irish footballer who played for, among others, Bury and Brentford. Gorman was a dual internationalist who also played for both Ireland teams – the FAI XI and the IFA XI. In September 1946 Gorman, along with Johnny Carey, actually played for both teams against England within three days of each other. The 11 international caps Gorman won while playing for Bury remain a club record.

Club career
Although born in County Sligo, Gorman was raised in Scotland and spoke with a Scottish accent. He began his footballing career with junior club Shettleston. An engineer by trade, he went completely bald by the time he was 19 and subsequently became known as Old Naked Brains. In 1936, at the age of 25, Gorman moved south to the English League and joined Bury. Early in the 1938–39 season, Gorman made a £7,000 move to Brentford where he is still talked of as one of the club's greatest ever defenders.

During the Second World War, Gorman continued to play for Brentford in regional leagues. However, he also spent time in Lancashire where he had two spells guesting regularly for Bury. He spent the 1943–44 season guesting at Bolton Wanderers where his teammates included a young Nat Lofthouse. The war also gave Gorman the chance to guest with both Manchester United and Liverpool. In October 1950 he was appointed player-manager of Deal Town of the semi-professional Kent League. He eventually retired as a player in 1952, but as a manager guided Deal to the league title in 1954.

Irish international
When Gorman began his international career in 1936 there were, in effect, two Ireland teams, chosen by two rival associations. Both associations, the Northern Ireland – based IFA and the Irish Free State – based FAI claimed jurisdiction over the whole of Ireland and selected players from the whole island. As a result, several notable Irish players from this era, including Gorman, played for both teams.

FAI XI
Between 1936 and 1947 Gorman made 13 appearances for the FAI XI. He made his international debut on 17 March 1936 in a 1–0 win against Switzerland at Dalymount Park. Among the highlights of his international career were helping the FAI XI beat Germany 5–2 in a friendly on 17 October 1936. On 7 November 1937 he also played for the FAI XI in a World Cup qualifier against Norway. The game finished as a 3–3 draw. On 30 September 1946 he was a member of the first ever FAI XI to play against England. Despite a credible performance, the FAI XI lost 1–0. Two days earlier Gorman had made his debut for the IFA XI against the same opponents. He made his last appearance for the FAI XI on 4 May 1947 in 2–0 defeat against Portugal.

IFA XI
Between 1946 and 1948 Gorman also made four appearances for the IFA XI. He made his debut for the IFA XI on 28 September 1946 in a 7–2 defeat against England. On 27 November 1946, together with Johnny Carey, Con Martin, Peter Farrell, Tommy Eglington, Alex Stevenson and Davy Walsh, he was one of seven players born in the Irish Free State to line up for the IFA XI against Scotland at Hampden Park. The 0–0 draw helped the IFA XI finish as runners-up in the 1947 British Home Championship. He also helped the IFA XI gain a 2–1 victory over Wales on 16 April 1947. His fourth and final appearance for the IFA XI was a 2–0 defeat to Wales on 10 March 1948.

Later years
In February 1955 Gorman returned to Bury to work as an engineering inspector. He remained a regular spectator at Bury F.C. matches, and also carried out some scouting work for Manchester City while his friend George Poyser was manager. He took early retirement from his job in March 1975. His wife died suddenly, only a few weeks later. After a couple of heart attacks, he died in November 1978 at the age of 67. His daughter and grandson subsequently worked for Bury F.C.

Honours

Player 
Ireland
British Home Championship
Runners-up 1946–47 1

Manager 
Deal Town

Kent League
Winners 1953–54: 1

Individual 
 Brentford Hall of Fame

References

External links
Northern Ireland's Footballing Greats

1911 births
1978 deaths
Republic of Ireland association footballers
Republic of Ireland football managers
Pre-1950 IFA international footballers
Ireland (FAI) international footballers
Dual Irish international footballers
Bury F.C. players
Bury F.C. wartime guest players
Brentford F.C. players
Manchester United F.C. wartime guest players
Bolton Wanderers F.C. wartime guest players
Liverpool F.C. wartime guest players
People from County Sligo
Glasgow United F.C. players
Deal Town F.C. players
Irish Free State international footballers
Deal Town F.C. managers
Association football fullbacks